Henry Bourchier, 5th Baron Bourchier, 2nd Count of Eu, 1st Viscount Bourchier, 1st Earl of Essex, KG ( – 4 April 1483), was the eldest son of William Bourchier, 1st Count of Eu, and Anne of Gloucester. On his mother's side, he was a great-grandson of Edward III of England.

Titles

He inherited the title of 5th Baron Bourchier from his cousin Elizabeth Bourchier, 4th Baroness Bourchier on her death in 1433. He became the 1st Viscount Bourchier in 1446, a Knight of the Order of the Garter in 1452, and was created 1st Earl of Essex in 1461.

Career
He saw considerable military action in France and for his services was created Viscount Bourchier during the parliament of 1445–6, and elected Knight of the Garter on his third nomination in 1452. He later saw action in 1461 as a Yorkist supporter at the Second Battle of St Albans and the Battle of Towton, soon after which Edward IV created him Earl of Essex.

He held the post of Lord High Treasurer from 29 May 1455 - 5 October 1456, 28 July 1460 - 14 April 1462, and 22 April 1471 - 4 April 1483. He also became Justice in Eyre south of the Trent in 1461, holding that title until his death. Bourchier's tenure as Lord High Treasurer occurred during the Great Bullion Famine and the Great Slump in England.

He died on 4 April 1483 and was buried at Beeleigh Abbey, although his tomb was subsequently moved to Little Easton church.

Marriage and issue
Prior to 1426, he married Isabel of Cambridge, a great-granddaughter of Edward III. She was the elder sister of Richard Plantagenet, which made her the aunt of Richard's sons, the future kings Edward IV and Richard III.

Henry and Isabel were parents to at least eleven children.

William Bourchier, Viscount Bourchier (d. 1480). Married Anne Woodville, daughter of Richard Woodville, 1st Earl Rivers and Jacquetta of Luxembourg. They were parents of Henry Bourchier, 2nd Earl of Essex and Cicely Bourchier, wife of John Devereux, 9th Baron Ferrers of Chartley.
Henry Bourchier (d. 1462). Married Elizabeth de Scales, Baroness Scales. No known children.
Humphrey Bourchier, 1st and last Lord Bourchier of Cromwell (d. 14 April 1471). Killed in the Battle of Barnet.
John Bourchier (d. 1495). Married first Elizabeth Ferrers and secondly Elizabeth Chichele. No known children.
Edward Bourchier (d. 30 December 1460). Killed in the Battle of Wakefield.
Thomas Bourchier (d. 1492). Married Isabella Barre. No known children.
Florence Bourchier (d. 1525).
Fulk Bourchier. Considered to have died young.
Hugh Bourchier. Considered to have died young.
Isabella Bourchier. Considered to have died young.
Laura Bourchier (1440- ) married John Courtenay (killed at Tewkesbury, 1471)

On his death, she did not remarry and died more than a year later.

References

Bibliography

External links
 Luminarium Dictionary: Henry Bourchier, Earl of Essex (d.1483)

Ancestry

Essex, Bourchier Henry 1st earl
Essex, Bourchier Henry 1st earl
15th-century English people
01
05
Essex, Bourchier Henry 1st earl
Essex, Bourchier Henry 1st earl
Essex, Bourchier Henry 1st earl
Henry Bourchier, 1st Earl of Essex